William Raimond Baird (1848–1917) was the namesake of Baird's Manual of American College Fraternities and publisher of its early editions.

Biography
He was born in 1848 and in 1878 he graduated from Stevens Institute of Technology in Hoboken, New Jersey. He exhaustively researched other organizations seeking a suitable partner to merge with his own Alpha Sigma Chi fraternity. He selected Beta Theta Pi, which absorbed ΑΣΧ in 1879. As no authoritative resource on the subject existed, Baird published his research for the benefit of the public as American College Fraternities. He continued to refine the work, publishing a total of eight editions under his name as author.  

In addition to his membership in local Alpha Sigma Chi that became a chapter of Beta Theta Pi, Baird was a member of Phi Delta Phi (international legal honor society) and Tau Beta Pi (engineering honor society).

Baird died in 1917.

References

External links
 

Stevens Institute of Technology alumni
1848 births
1917 deaths